Almendra - Aldemaro Romero en Cuba is an LP album by Venezuelan composer/arranger/conductor Aldemaro Romero. It was recorded in Havana, Cuba, and released in 1957 by RCA Victor. It was reissued in 1992 on CD.

Track listing

Credits 
Piano, arranger & director: Aldemaro Romero 
Percussion: Willie Rodríguez, Manny Oquendo, Ray Rodríguez 
Trumpet: Bernie Glow, El Negro Vivar, Jack Mootz, Fred Lambert 
Saxophone: Al Epstein, Dave Kurtzer, Morty Lewis, Joseph d'Addario 
Trombone: Harry DiVito 
Vocals: Miguel de Gonzalo 
Technical
Produced by Chico O'Farrill 
Recorded by Dick Baxter
Mastered by Domingo G. Echevarría

References

1957 albums
Aldemaro Romero albums
RCA Records albums
Spanish-language albums